The 2022–23 Kansas Jayhawks women's basketball team represented the University of Kansas in the 2022–23 NCAA Division I women's basketball season. The Jayhawks are led by eighth-year head coach Brandon Schneider. They played their home games at Allen Fieldhouse in Lawrence, Kansas as members of the Big 12 Conference.

Previous season
The Jayhawks finished the season 21–10, 11–7 in Big 12 play to finish in a tie for fifth place. As the fifth seed in the Big 12 Tournament, they lost to Oklahoma in the quaterfinals. They received an at-large bid to the 2022 NCAA tournament, which was their first since 2013, where they defeated Georgia Tech before losing in the second round to Stanford.

Offseason

Departures

Incoming

Recruiting
There were no recruiting classing class of 2022.

Recruiting class of 2023

Roster

Schedule and results 
Source:

|-
!colspan=9 style=""| Non-conference

|-
!colspan=9 style=""| Conference

|-
!colspan=9 style=""| Big 12 Tournament

|-
!colspan=9 style=""| WNIT

Rankings

*The preseason and week 1 polls were the same.^Coaches did not release a week 2 poll.

See also 
 2022–23 Kansas Jayhawks men's basketball team

References 

Kansas Jayhawks women's basketball seasons
Kansas
Kansas Jayhawks women's basketball
Kansas Jayhawks women's basketball